Andrew Lang  (31 March 1844 – 20 July 1912) was a Scottish poet, novelist, literary critic, and contributor to the field of anthropology. He is best known as a collector of folk and fairy tales. The Andrew Lang lectures at the University of St Andrews are named after him.

Biography 
Lang was born in 1844 in Selkirk, Scottish Borders. He was the eldest of the eight children born to John Lang, the town clerk of Selkirk, and his wife Jane Plenderleath Sellar, who was the daughter of Patrick Sellar, factor to the first Duke of Sutherland. On 17 April 1875, he married Leonora Blanche Alleyne, youngest daughter of C. T. Alleyne of Clifton and Barbados. She was (or should have been) variously credited as author, collaborator, or translator of Lang's Color/Rainbow Fairy Books which he edited.

He was educated at Selkirk Grammar School, Loretto School, and the Edinburgh Academy, as well as the University of St Andrews and Balliol College, Oxford, where he took a first class in the final classical schools in 1868, becoming a fellow and subsequently honorary fellow of Merton College. He soon made a reputation as one of the most able and versatile writers of the day as a journalist, poet, critic, and historian. He was a member of the Order of the White Rose, a Neo-Jacobite society which attracted many writers and artists in the 1890s and 1900s. In 1906, he was elected FBA.

He died of angina pectoris on 20 July 1912 at the Tor-na-Coille Hotel in Banchory, Banchory, survived by his wife. He was buried in the cathedral precincts at St Andrews, where a monument can be visited in the south-east corner of the 19th century section.

Scholarship

Folklore and anthropology 

Lang is now chiefly known for his publications on folklore, mythology, and religion. The interest in folklore was from early life; he read John Ferguson McLennan before coming to Oxford, and then was influenced by E. B. Tylor.

The earliest of his publications is Custom and Myth (1884). In Myth, Ritual and Religion (1887) he explained the "irrational" elements of mythology as survivals from more primitive forms. Lang's Making of Religion was heavily influenced by the 18th century idea of the "noble savage": in it, he maintained the existence of high spiritual ideas among so-called "savage" races, drawing parallels with the contemporary interest in occult phenomena in England. His Blue Fairy Book (1889) was an illustrated edition of fairy tales that has become a classic. This was followed by many other collections of fairy tales, collectively known as Andrew Lang's Fairy Books despite most of the work for them being done by his wife Leonora Blanche Alleyne and a team of mostly female assistants. In the preface of the Lilac Fairy Book he credits his wife with translating and transcribing most of the stories in the collections. Lang examined the origins of totemism in Social Origins (1903).

Psychical research 
Lang was one of the founders of "psychical research" and his other writings on anthropology include The Book of Dreams and Ghosts (1897), Magic and Religion (1901) and The Secret of the Totem (1905). He served as president of the Society for Psychical Research in 1911.

Lang extensively cited nineteenth- and twentieth-century European spiritualism to challenge the idea of his teacher, Tylor, that belief in spirits and animism were inherently irrational. Lang used Tylor's work and his own psychical research in an effort to posit an anthropological critique of materialism. Andrew Lang fiercely debated with his Folklore Society colleague Edward Clodd over 'Psycho-folklore' a strand of the discipline which aimed to connect folklore with psychical research.

Classical scholarship 

He collaborated with S. H. Butcher in a prose translation (1879) of Homer's Odyssey, and with E. Myers and Walter Leaf in a prose version (1883) of the Iliad, both still noted for their archaic but attractive style. He was a Homeric scholar of conservative views. Other works include Homer and the Study of Greek found in Essays in Little (1891), Homer and the Epic (1893); a prose translation of The Homeric Hymns (1899), with literary and mythological essays in which he draws parallels between Greek myths and other mythologies; Homer and his Age (1906); and "Homer and Anthropology" (1908).

Historian 

Lang's writings on Scottish history are characterised by a scholarly care for detail, a piquant literary style, and a gift for disentangling complicated questions. The Mystery of Mary Stuart (1901) was a consideration of the fresh light thrown on Mary, Queen of Scots, by the Lennox manuscripts in the University Library, Cambridge, approving of her and criticising her accusers.

He also wrote monographs on The Portraits and Jewels of Mary Stuart (1906) and James VI and the Gowrie Mystery (1902). The somewhat unfavourable view of John Knox presented in his book John Knox and the Reformation (1905) aroused considerable controversy. He gave new information about the continental career of the Young Pretender in Pickle the Spy (1897), an account of Alestair Ruadh MacDonnell, whom he identified with Pickle, a notorious Hanoverian spy. This was followed by The Companions of Pickle (1898) and a monograph on Prince Charles Edward (1900). In 1900 he began a History of Scotland from the Roman Occupation (1900). The Valet's Tragedy (1903), which takes its title from an essay on Dumas's Man in the Iron Mask, collects twelve papers on historical mysteries, and A Monk of Fife (1896) is a fictitious narrative purporting to be written by a young Scot in France in 1429–1431.

Other writings 
Lang's earliest publication was a volume of metrical experiments, The Ballads and Lyrics of Old France (1872), and this was followed at intervals by other volumes of dainty verse, Ballades in Blue China (1880, enlarged edition, 1888), Ballads and Verses Vain (1884), selected by Mr Austin Dobson; Rhymes à la Mode (1884), Grass of Parnassus (1888), Ban and Arrière Ban (1894), New Collected Rhymes (1905). His 1890 collection, Old Friends: Essays in Epistolary Parody, contains letters combining characters from different sources, in what is now known as a crossover, including one based on Jane Austen's Northanger Abbey and Charlotte Brontë's Jane Eyre – an early example of a published derivative work based on Austen.

Lang was active as a journalist in various ways, ranging from sparkling "leaders" for the Daily News to miscellaneous articles for the Morning Post, and for many years he was literary editor of Longman's Magazine; no critic was in more request, whether for occasional articles and introductions to new editions or as editor of dainty reprints.

He edited The Poems and Songs of Robert Burns (1896), and was responsible for the Life and Letters (1897) of JG Lockhart, and The Life, Letters and Diaries (1890) of Sir Stafford Northcote, 1st Earl of Iddesleigh. Lang discussed literary subjects with the same humour and acidity that marked his criticism of fellow folklorists, in Books and Bookmen (1886), Letters to Dead Authors (1886), Letters on Literature (1889), etc.

Works

To 1884 

 St Leonards Magazine. 1863. This was a reprint of several articles that appeared in the St Leonards Magazine that Lang edited at St Andrews University. Includes the following Lang contributions: Pages 10–13, Dawgley Manor; A sentimental burlesque; Pages 25–26, Nugae Catulus; Pages 27–30, Popular Philosophies; pages 43–50 are Papers by Eminent Contributors, seven short parodies of which six are by Lang.
 The Ballads and Lyrics of Old France (1872)
 The Odyssey of Homer Rendered into English Prose (1879) translator with Samuel Henry Butcher
 Aristotle's Politics Books I. III. IV. (VII.). The Text of Bekker. With an English translation by W. E. Bolland. Together with short introductory essays by A. Lang To page 106 are Lang's Essays, pp. 107–305 are the translation. Lang's essays without the translated text were later published as The Politics of Aristotle. Introductory Essays. 1886.
 The Folklore of France (1878)
 Specimens of a Translation of Theocritus. 1879. This was an advance issue of extracts from Theocritus, Bion and Moschus rendered into English prose
 XXXII Ballades in Blue China (1880)
 Oxford. Brief historical & descriptive notes (1880).  The 1915 edition of this work was illustrated by painter George Francis Carline.
  'Theocritus Bion and Moschus. Rendered into English Prose with an Introductory Essay. 1880.
 Notes by Mr A. Lang on a collection of pictures by Mr J. E. Millais R.A. exhibited at the Fine Arts Society Rooms. 148 New Bond Street. 1881.
 The Library: with a chapter on modern illustrated books. 1881.
 The Black Thief.  A new and original drama (Adapted from the Irish) in four acts. (1882)
 Helen of Troy, her life and translation. Done into rhyme from the Greek books. 1882.
 The Most Pleasant and Delectable Tale of the Marriage of Cupid and Psyche (1882) with William Aldington
 The Iliad of Homer, a prose translation (1883) with Walter Leaf and Ernest Myers
 Custom and Myth (1884)
 The Princess Nobody: A Tale of Fairyland (1884)
 Ballads and Verses Vain (1884) selected by Austin Dobson
 Rhymes à la Mode (1884)
 Much Darker Days. By A. Huge Longway. (1884)
 Household tales; their origin, diffusion, and relations to the higher myths. [1884]. Separate pre-publication issue of the "introduction" to Bohn's edition of Grimm's Household tales.

 1885–1889 
 That Very Mab (1885) with May Kendall
 Books and Bookmen (1886)
 Letters to Dead Authors (1886)
 In the Wrong Paradise (1886) stories
 The Mark of Cain (1886) novel
 Lines on the inaugural meeting of the Shelley Society. Reprinted for private distribution from the Saturday Review of 13 March 1886 and edited by Thomas Wise (1886)
 La Mythologie Traduit de L'Anglais par Léon Léon Parmentier. Avec une préface par Charles Michel et des Additions de l'auteur.  (1886) Never published as a complete book in English, although there was a Polish translation. The first 170 pages is a translation of the article in the 'Encyclopædia Britannica'. The rest is a combination of articles and material from 'Custom and Myth'.
 Almae matres (1887)
 He (1887 with Walter Herries Pollock) parody
 Aucassin and Nicolette (1887)
 Myth, Ritual and Religion  (2 vols., 1887)
 Johnny Nut and the Golden Goose. Done into English from the French of Charles Deulin (1887)
 Grass of Parnassus. Rhymes old and new. (1888)
 Perrault's Popular Tales (1888)
 Gold of Fairnilee (1888)
 Pictures at Play or Dialogues of the Galleries (1888) with W. E. Henley
 Prince Prigio (1889)
 The Blue Fairy Book (1889) (illustrations by Henry J. Ford)
 Letters on Literature (1889)
 Lost Leaders (1889)
 Ode to Golf. Contribution to On the Links; being Golfing Stories by various hands (1889)
 The Dead Leman and other tales from the French (1889) translator with Paul Sylvester

 1890–1899 

 The Red Fairy Book (1890)
 The World's Desire (1890) with H. Rider Haggard
 Old Friends: Essays in Epistolary Parody (1890)
 The Strife of Love in a Dream, Being the Elizabethan Version of the First Book of the Hypnerotomachia of Francesco Colonna (1890)
 The Life, Letters and Diaries of Sir Stafford Northcote, 1st Earl of Iddesleigh (1890)
 Etudes traditionnistes (1890)
 How to Fail in Literature (1890)
 The Blue Poetry Book (1891)
 Essays in Little (1891)
 On Calais Sands (1891)
 Angling Sketches (1891)
 The Green Fairy Book (1892)
 The Library with a Chapter on Modern English Illustrated Books (1892) with Austin Dobson
 William Young Sellar (1892)
 The True Story Book (1893)
 Homer and the Epic (1893)
 Prince Ricardo of Pantouflia (1893)
 Waverley Novels (by Walter Scott), 48 volumes (1893) editor
 St. Andrews (1893)
 Montezuma's Daughter (1893) with H. Rider Haggard
 Kirk's Secret Commonwealth (1893)
 The Tercentenary of Izaak Walton (1893)
 The Yellow Fairy Book (1894)
 Ban and Arrière Ban (1894)
 Cock Lane and Common-Sense (1894)
 Memoir of R. F. Murray (1894)
 The Red True Story Book (1895)
 My Own Fairy Book (1895)
 A Monk of Fife (1895)
 The Voices of Jeanne D'Arc (1895)
 The Animal Story Book (1896)
 The Poems and Songs of Robert Burns (1896) editor
 The Life and Letters of John Gibson Lockhart (1896) two volumes
 Pickle the Spy; or the Incognito of Charles, (1897)
 The Nursery Rhyme Book (1897)
 The Miracles of Madame Saint Katherine of Fierbois (1897) translator
 The Pink Fairy Book (1897)
 A Book of Dreams and Ghosts (1897)
 Pickle the Spy (1897)
 
 The Companions of Pickle (1898)
 The Arabian Nights Entertainments (1898)
 The Making of Religion (1898)
 Selections from Coleridge (1898)
 Waiting on the Glesca Train (1898)
 The Red Book of Animal Stories (1899)
 Parson Kelly (1899) Co-written with A. E. W. Mason
 The Homeric Hymns (1899) translator
 The Works of Charles Dickens in Thirty-four Volumes (1899) editor

 1900–1909 
 The Grey Fairy Book (1900)
 Prince Charles Edward (1900)
 Parson Kelly (1900)
 The Poems and Ballads of Sir Walter Scott, Bart (1900) editor
 A History of Scotland – From the Roman Occupation (1900–1907) four volumes
 Notes and Names in Books (1900)
 Alfred Tennyson (1901)
 Magic and Religion (1901)
 Adventures Among Books (1901)
 The Crimson Fairy Book (1903)
 The Mystery of Mary Stuart (1901, new and revised ed., 1904)
 The Book of Romance (1902)
 The Disentanglers (1902)
 James VI and the Gowrie Mystery (1902)
 Notre-Dame of Paris (1902) translator
 The Young Ruthvens (1902)
 The Gowrie Conspiracy: the Confessions of Sprott (1902) editor
 The Violet Fairy Book (1901)
 Lyrics (1903)
 Social England Illustrated (1903) editor
 The Story of the Golden Fleece (1903)
 The Valet's Tragedy (1903)
 Social Origins (1903) with Primal Law by James Jasper Atkinson
 The Snowman and Other Fairy Stories (1903)
 Stella Fregelius: A Tale of Three Destinies (1903) with H. Rider Haggard
 The Brown Fairy Book (1904)
 Historical Mysteries (1904)
 The Secret of the Totem (1905)
 New Collected Rhymes (1905)
 John Knox and the Reformation (1905)
 The Puzzle of Dickens's Last Plot (1905)
 The Clyde Mystery. A Study in Forgeries and Folklore (1905)
 Adventures among Books (1905)
 Homer and His Age (1906)
 The Red Romance Book (1906)
 The Orange Fairy Book (1906)
 The Portraits and Jewels of Mary Stuart (1906)
 Life of Sir Walter Scott (1906)
 The Story of Joan of Arc (1906)
 New and Old Letters to Dead Authors (1906)
 Tales of a Fairy Court (1907)
 The Olive Fairy Book (1907)
 Poets' Country (1907) editor, with Churton Collins, W. J. Loftie, E. Hartley Coleridge, Michael Macmillan
 The King over the Water (1907)
 Tales of Troy and Greece (1907)
 The Origins of Religion (1908) essays
 The Book of Princes and Princesses (1908)
 Origins of Terms of Human Relationships (1908)
 Select Poems of Jean Ingelow (1908) editor
 The Maid of France, being the story of the life and death of Jeanne d'Arc (1908)
 Three Poets of French Bohemia (1908)
 The Red Book of Heroes (1909)
 The Marvellous Musician and Other Stories (1909)
 Sir George Mackenzie King's Advocate, of Rosehaugh, His Life and Times (1909)

 1910–1912 
 The Lilac Fairy Book (1910)
 Does Ridicule Kill? (1910)
 Sir Walter Scott and the Border Minstrelsy (1910)
 The World of Homer (1910)
 The All Sorts of Stories Book (1911)
 Ballades and Rhymes (1911)
 Method in the Study of Totemism (1911)
 The Book of Saints and Heroes (1912)
 Shakespeare, Bacon and the Great Unknown (1912)
 A History of English Literature (1912)
 In Praise of Frugality (1912)
 Ode on a Distant Memory of Jane Eyre (1912)
 Ode to the Opening Century (1912)

 Posthumous 
 Highways and Byways in The Border (1913) with John Lang
 The Strange Story Book (1913) with Mrs. Lang
 The Poetical Works (1923) edited by Mrs. Lang, four volumes
 Old Friends Among the Fairies: Puss in Boots and Other Stories. Chosen from the Fairy Books (1926)
 Tartan Tales From Andrew Lang (1928) edited by Bertha L. Gunterman
 From Omar Khayyam (1935)

 Andrew Lang's Fairy Books 

Lang selected and edited 25 collections of stories that were published annually, beginning with The Blue Fairy Book in 1889 and ending with The Strange Story Book in 1913. They are sometimes called Andrew Lang's Fairy Books although the Blue Fairy Book and other Coloured Fairy Books are only 12 in the series. In this chronological list the Coloured Fairy Books alone are numbered.

(1) The Blue Fairy Book (1889)
(2) The Red Fairy Book (1890)
 The Blue Poetry Book (1891)
(3) The Green Fairy Book (1892)
 The True Story Book (1893)
(4) The Yellow Fairy Book (1894)
 The Red True Story Book (1895)
 The Animal Story Book (1896)
(5) The Pink Fairy Book (1897)
 The Arabian Nights' Entertainments (1898)
 The Red Book of Animal Stories (1899)
(6) The Grey Fairy Book (1900)
(7) The Violet Fairy Book (1901)
 The Book of Romance (1902)
(8) The Crimson Fairy Book (1903)
(9) The Brown Fairy Book (1904)
 The Red Romance Book (1905)
(10) The Orange Fairy Book (1906)
(11) The Olive Fairy Book (1907)
 The Book of Princes and Princesses (1908)
 The Red Book of Heroes (1909)
(12) The Lilac Fairy Book (1910)
 The All Sorts of Stories Book (1911)
 The Book of Saints and Heroes (1912)
 The Strange Story Book (1913)

 References 

Relevant literature
 de Cocq, Antonius P. L. (1968) Andrew Lang: A nineteenth century anthropologist (Diss. Rijksuniversiteit Utrecht, The Netherlands). Tilburg: Zwijsen.
 Demoor, Marysa. (1983) Andrew Lang (1844-1912) : late victorian humanist and journalistic critic with a descriptive checklist of the Lang letters. Vols. 1–2. RUG. Faculteit Letteren en Wijsbegeerte.
 Demoor, Marysa (1987). Andrew Lang’s Letters to Edmund Gosse: The Record of a Fruitful Collaboration as Poets, Critics, and Biographers. The Review of English Studies, 38(152), 492–509.
 Lang, Andrew.(1989) “Friends over the Ocean: Andrew Lang’s American Correspondents, 1881-1921.” Edited by Marysa Demoor. Werken / Uitgegeven Door de Faculteit van de Letteren En Wijsbegegeerte, Rijksuniversiteit. Gent: Universa.
 Lang, Andrew. (1990)Dear Stevenson: Letters from Andrew Lang to Robert Louis Stevenson with Five Letters from Stevenson to Lang. Edited by Marysa Demoor. Leuven: Peeters.
 Green, Roger Lancelyn. (1946) Andrew Lang: A critical biography with a short-title bibliography. Leicester: Ward.
 Lang, Andrew. 2015. The Edinburgh Critical Edition of the Selected Writings of Andrew Lang, Volume I.  Edited by Andrew Teverson, Alexandra Warwick, and Leigh Wilson.  Edinburgh: Edinburgh University Press. 456 pages.  (hard cover). 
 Lang, Andrew. 2015. The Edinburgh Critical Edition of the Selected Writings of Andrew Lang, Volume II. Edited by Andrew Teverson, Alexandra Warwick, and Leigh Wilson. Edinburgh: Edinburgh University Press. 416 pages.  (hard cover). 

 External links 

 
 
 
 
 
 
 Andrew Lang Fairy Tale Books
 Index to the fairy tales in the Andrew Lang Fairy Tale Books
 A Monk of Fife Complete Book Online
 Andrew Lang, The Making of Religion, Longmans, Green and Co., 1909. (1889–90 Gifford Lectures)
 Andrew Lang, Letters to Dead Authors, transcribed from the 1886 Longman's edition.
 Andrew Lang, Introduction to  Marian Roalfe Cox's Cinderella: Three Hundred and Forty-Five Variants of Cinderella, Catskin and, Cap O' Rushes, Abstracted and Tabulated with a Discussion of Medieval Analogues and Notes''.
 
 
 
 
 
 
 
 
 
 
 
 andrewlangessays.com Japanese

 Andrew Lang Collection. General Collection, Beinecke Rare Book and Manuscript Library, Yale University.

1844 births
1912 deaths
Alumni of the University of St Andrews
Alumni of Balliol College, Oxford
Collectors of fairy tales
Fellows of Merton College, Oxford
Parapsychologists
People from Selkirk, Scottish Borders
Scottish children's writers
Scottish folklorists
20th-century Scottish historians
Scottish journalists
Scottish novelists
Scottish poets
19th-century Scottish historians
Victorian poets
People educated at Selkirk High School
Victorian novelists
19th-century Scottish writers
20th-century Scottish writers
People educated at Loretto School, Musselburgh
People educated at Edinburgh Academy
Folklore writers
Fellows of the British Academy
Neo-Jacobite Revival
Translators of Homer
Presidents of the Folklore Society